Rossum is a village in the Dutch province of Gelderland. It is a part of the municipality of Maasdriel, and lies about 11 km southwest of Tiel.

Rossum was a separate municipality between 1818 and 1999, when it was merged with Maasdriel.

History 
It was first mentioned in 893 as Rotheheym, and means "settlement near cleared forest". It developed into a stretched out esdorp with a centre near the church and one near the castle. The Dutch Reformed Church was a tower of the 16th century with 12th century elements. The church dates from 1860. Huis Rossum was a castle from the 13th century. It was destroyed in 1599 during the Siege of Zaltbommel, and the remainder was demolished in 1740. In 1848, a manor house was constructed on the site of the former castle. In 1840, Rossum was home to 845 people.

Gallery

References

Municipalities of the Netherlands disestablished in 1999
Populated places in Gelderland
Former municipalities of Gelderland
Maasdriel